The Mayor of Mandalay is the head of Mandalay City Development Committee which serves the Myanmar's second largest city, Mandalay.The current mayor is Kyaw San appointed by SAC chairman Min Aung Hlaing.

List of mayors

1992 - 2011
Colonel Sein Win Aung
Brigadier general Yan Thein
Brigadier general Phone Zaw Han

(2011–present)

References 

Mandalay